Taurolema albopunctata is a species of beetle in the family Cerambycidae. It was described by Gounelle in 1906. It is known from Costa Rica and Guatemala.

References

Mauesiini
Beetles described in 1906